The Marèges Dam is a concrete arch dam on the Dordogne River. It was constructed between 1932 and 1935 by the Railway Company du Midi. Its primary purpose is the generation of hydroelectricity and the original power station contained four Francis turbine-generators.

The dam and its power plant was built to help France become less dependent on costly energy resource imports after World War I. The fifth Francis turbine-generator, rated at 122 MW, at the Saint Pierre power station, on the left bank of the river, was commissioned in 1988.

The dam, designed by André Coyne, incorporated several innovative features to include a ski-jump spillway, the right abutment anchored with a prestressed cables and monitored with vibrating wire sensors (emitting an audible signals like a guitar), and a new cofferdam design.

See also 

 Renewable energy in France

References

External links
 

Arch dams
Dams completed in 1935
Dams in France
Energy infrastructure completed in 1935
Hydroelectric power stations in France
RMareges
20th-century architecture in France